HMS Clonmel was a Hunt-class minesweeper of the Royal Navy from World War I. She was originally to be named Stranraer, but was renamed before launch to avoid possible misunderstandings of having vessels named after coastal locations.

See also
 Clonmel, Ireland

References
 

 

Hunt-class minesweepers (1916)
Royal Navy ship names
1918 ships